Carrickmacross lace is a form of lace that may be described as decorated net. A three-layer 'sandwich' is made consisting of the pattern (at the bottom), covered with, first, machine-made net and then fine muslin, through which the pattern can be seen. A thick outlining thread is stitched down along the lines of the pattern, sewing net and fabric together. Loops of thread known as 'twirls' are also couched along the outer edge. The excess fabric is then cut away. Some of the net is then usually decorated further with needle-run stitches or small button-holed rings known as 'pops'. Occasionally bars of buttonhole stitches are worked over fabric and net before both are cut away.

History
Carrickmacross lace was introduced into Ireland in about 1820 by Mrs Grey Porter of Donaghmoyne, who taught it to local women so that they could earn some extra money. Porter had been inspired by some examples of appliqué lace she had seen while on her honeymoon in Italy in 1816.

The scheme was initially of limited success, and it was only after the Great Famine in 1846, when a lace school was set up by the managers of the Bath and Shirley estates at Carrickmacross as a means of helping their starving tenants, that the lace became known and found sales.

The wedding dress of Lady Diana Spencer featured a square of Carrickmacross lace that had belonged to Queen Mary sewn to the front. 

Irish Fashion designer, Sybil Connolly (24 January 1921 – 6 May 1998) used Irish lace types in her design, often layering the lace over silk or satin. 

In 2011, Kate Middleton incorporated lace inspired by Carrickmacross lace, amongst others, into her wedding dress.

References

External links

Carrickmacross
Needle lace
Textile arts of Ireland